"Odds Are" is a song by Canadian rock band Barenaked Ladies. It is the second single from their 2013 album, Grinning Streak. It was released as a promotional single on July 14, 2013. The song is also the theme song for the television show Working the Engels.

History
"Odds Are" was written by Ed Robertson and Kevin Griffin, lead vocalist and guitarist from Better Than Ezra. "Odds Are" was recorded during the sessions for "Grinning Streak" from February to April 2013, and was produced by multi-platinum, multi-Juno Award-winning producer Gavin Brown. The band first premiered the song live on May 5, 2013 at Sunfest on the Waterfront in West Palm Beach, Florida.

In 2017, American singer/songwriter Kalie Shorr released her EP titled "Slingshot" which featured a country/pop version of "Odds Are".

Music video
Rooster Teeth Productions produced the music video for "Odds Are" released on October 8. The video features the band as news anchors reporting on the apocalypse occurring at the same time. Many Rooster Teeth personalities are featured as cameo guests including Barbara Dunkelman, Gavin Free, Burnie Burns, Gus Sorola, and Adam Kovic, with several internet personalities such as Justine Ezarik, Freddie Wong, and Greg Miller making appearances as well.

Charts
"Odds Are" debuting at No. 43 on the Adult Rock chart, No. 49 on the Hot Adult Contemporary chart, and No. 46 on the Canada Adult Contemporary chart. It ultimately reached No. 15).

References

Barenaked Ladies songs
Songs written by Ed Robertson
2013 singles
Songs written by Kevin Griffin
Song recordings produced by Gavin Brown (musician)
2013 songs
Vanguard Records singles